Damjan Robev (born April 10, 1997) is a Macedonian professional basketball player for MZT Skopje of Macedonian First League.

Professional career
On 8 August 2017, he signed with Macedonian basketball club Gostivar

References

External links
Eurobasket Profile
RealGM Profile
FIBA Profile
BGBasket Profile

1997 births
Living people
Macedonian men's basketball players
Shooting guards
Sportspeople from Skopje